Stephen Richard "Steve" Bourne (born 7 January 1944) is an English computer scientist based in the United States for most of his career. He is well known as the author of the Bourne shell (sh), which is the foundation for the standard command-line interfaces to Unix.

Biography
Bourne has a Bachelor of Science (B.S.) degree in mathematics from King's College London, England. He has a Diploma in Computer Science and a Doctor of Philosophy (Ph.D.) in mathematics from Trinity College, Cambridge. Subsequently, he worked on an ALGOL 68 compiler at the University of Cambridge Computer Laboratory (see ALGOL 68C). He also worked on CAMAL, a system for algebraic manipulation used for lunar theory calculations.

After the University of Cambridge, Bourne spent nine years at Bell Labs with the Seventh Edition Unix team. Besides the Bourne shell, he wrote the adb debugger and The Unix System, the second book on the topic, intended for general readers.

After Bell Labs, Bourne worked in senior engineering management positions at Silicon Graphics, Digital Equipment Corporation, Sun Microsystems, and Cisco Systems.

He was involved with developing international standards in programming and informatics, as a member of the International Federation for Information Processing (IFIP) IFIP Working Group 2.1 on Algorithmic Languages and Calculi, which specified, maintains, and supports the programming languages ALGOL 60 and ALGOL 68.

From 2000 to 2002 he was president of the Association for Computing Machinery (ACM). For his work on computing, Bourne was awarded the ACM's Presidential Award in 2008 and was made a Fellow of the organization in 2005. He is also a Fellow of the Royal Astronomical Society.

Bourne was chief technology officer at Icon Venture Partners, a venture capital firm based in Menlo Park, California through 2014. He is also chairperson of the editorial advisory board for ACM Queue, a magazine he helped found when he was president of the ACM.

References

External links 
 

Living people
British computer scientists
American computer scientists
Unix people
Alumni of King's College London
Alumni of Trinity College, Cambridge
Members of the University of Cambridge Computer Laboratory
Fellows of the Association for Computing Machinery
Presidents of the Association for Computing Machinery
British expatriates in the United States
Silicon Graphics people
Digital Equipment Corporation people
Sun Microsystems people
Programming language designers
Computer science writers
Cellular automatists
1944 births
Chief technology officers